Stanley Earl Robinson (July 14, 1988July 21, 2020) was an American professional basketball player. He primarily played the small forward position, but occasionally assumed the role of a power forward as well. Robinson played college basketball for the UConn Huskies.  He went on to play most of his professional career in South America.

Early life
Robinson was born in Birmingham, Alabama, on July 14, 1988.  He studied at the University of Connecticut, and played college basketball with the UConn Huskies.  In the run-up to the NBA draft in June 2010, he was described as a "strong offensive rebounder" and an "explosive finisher".  However, his quickness was somewhat cancelled out by mediocre ball-handling, and it was predicted that the absence of major development in his four years of college basketball would lead him to be selected in round two.

Professional career
Robinson was selected in the second round of the 2010 NBA draft by the Orlando Magic with the 59th overall pick. He signed a non-guaranteed, one-year contract with the Magic. However, Robinson was waived following the conclusion of training camp in October 2010.

For the 2011–2012 season, Robinson played with the Iowa Energy of the NBA Development League.

On October 17, 2013, Robinson signed with the Moncton Miracles of the National Basketball League of Canada (NBL). However, on February 5, 2014, he was released due to an injury. Robinson resigned with the Miracles on September 25 of that year.

On September 7, 2015, Robinson signed with Leones de Quilpué, a Chilean club that plays in the Liga Nacional de Básquetbol de Chile (LNB). The following July he moved to the Dominican Republic to play for Reales de La Vega, and in September 2016 he came back to Chile with Deportivo Valdivia, then in November he joined Defensor Sporting in Uruguay.

In November 2017, Robinson signed with Keflavík of the Icelandic Úrvalsdeild karla. Disappointed by his physical shape, Keflavík announced on January 2, 2018, they had released him and signed Dominique Elliott in his place. In five games in the Úrvalsdeild, Robinson averaged 15.6 points and 10.4 rebounds.

In January 2018, Robinson signed with Club Escuela de Básquetbol Puerto Montt. That September, he moved to Español de Talca also in Chile.

Personal life
Robinson was father to three daughters, and had moved back to his hometown of Birmingham.

Death
Stanley Robinson died from an accidental opioid overdose, the Jefferson County Coroner reported.
The cause of death is officially listed as “fentanyl toxicity".
Robinson was found unresponsive in his Birmingham, AL home on July 21, 2020, a week after his 32nd birthday.

See also 

 2006 boys high school basketball All-Americans

References

External links
 UConn Huskies bio
 NBADraft.net profile
 Realgm.com profile
 Eurobasket.com profile

1988 births
2020 deaths
American expatriate basketball people in Canada
American expatriate basketball people in Chile
American expatriate basketball people in the Dominican Republic
American expatriate basketball people in Iceland
American expatriate basketball people in Uruguay
American men's basketball players
African-American basketball players
Basketball players from Birmingham, Alabama
Iowa Energy players
Keflavík men's basketball players
Moncton Miracles players
Orlando Magic draft picks
Parade High School All-Americans (boys' basketball)
Power forwards (basketball)
Rio Grande Valley Vipers players
Small forwards
UConn Huskies men's basketball players
Úrvalsdeild karla (basketball) players
20th-century African-American people
21st-century African-American sportspeople